Villon may refer to:

 Villon (surname), a French surname
 Villon, Yonne, Burgundy, France
 10140 Villon, a main belt asteroid, named after François Villon

nl:Villon
pl:Villon